Shweta Mohan (born 19 November 1985) is an Indian playback singer. She has received four Filmfare Awards South for Best Female Playback Singer, one Kerala State Film Awards and one Tamil Nadu State Film Awards. She has recorded songs for film music and albums in all the four South Indian languages namely, Malayalam, Tamil, Telugu, Kannada along with the Hindi language and has established herself as a leading playback singer of South Indian cinema. Some of her inspirations are Sujatha Mohan (her mother), Lata Mangeshkar and K.S. Chitra

Malayalam songs

Tamil songs

Telugu songs

Kannada songs

Hindi songs

References

External links 
List of Malayalam songs by Shweta Mohan at MalayalaSangeetham
 at Times Of India
 at The News Time
 at Times Of India

Mohan, Shweta